Azura is a wave power device currently being tested in Hawaii. It is connected to the municipal grid providing electricity to Hawaii. According to the United States Department of Energy, this is the first time that a wave power generator has been officially verified to be supplying energy to a power grid in North America. This has been verified by the University of Hawaii. The device can generate 20 kilowatts of power.

The device is at the Marine Corps Base Hawaii's Wave Energy Test Site (WETS) on the north shore of Kaneohe Bay, Oahu. It is situated on the surface of a 30-meter-deep berth where it is being monitored.

This prototype (TRL 5/6) was developed by Northwest Energy Innovations (NWEI) with the support of the U.S. Navy, the United States Department of Energy, and the University of Hawaii. It will be in operation for a 1-year period of assessment. During that time, the University of Hawaii will be responsible for the collection and analysis of data.

Azura was originally named "WET-NZ" from "Wave Energy Technology-New Zealand".

Background 
Development was in 2006 by Callaghan Innovation  and was first called WET-NZ. The initial concept was called the TRL 1, entered the micro-modeling stage under the name TRL 3, and is being tested in the open ocean with large scale prototypes called TRL 5/6 deployed near Christchurch, New Zealand

Description and operation
Azura floats on the surface of the sea and weighs 45 tons (41 tonnes). It has a unique floating mechanism that can rotate 360 degrees. This enables it to extract power from horizontal (surge) as well as vertical (heave) wave motion. It has reserve buoyancy that is very low, allowing it to partially submerge beneath large waves.

Azura is a point absorber. This means that it uses a floating surface mechanism to absorb the energy of waves from different directions. This is the most common type of deepwater wave energy generator. The generator is driven with a high-pressure hydraulics system.  The wave motion is captured by the circular rotation of the floating mechanism, and translated to crankshafts within the Azura.  These crankshafts provide the motion for the high pressure hydraulic system.

Environmental Considerations
Many agencies have overseen and conducted assessments on the project prior to implementation. These included US Army Corps of Engineers, the US Coast Guard, the US Fish and Wildlife Service, and the National Marine Fisheries Service. Oregon-based Department of State Lands, Department of Land Conservation and Development, and Department of Fish and Wildlife reviewed the project as well.

Preliminary tests
The initial phase of development used a smaller prototype that was tested in a wave tank.

A second prototype was then installed in 2012 for a 6-week period at the Northwest National Marine Renewable Energy Center’s test site off the coast of Oregon in an open-sea area. During that test, the device was exposed to wave heights of up to 3.75-meters in a 12 to 14-second sea state.

Both tests were successful.

Future plans
NWEI will use information gathered during the current test to further develop the project. With the Department of Energy providing an additional $5 million, NWEI plans to modify Azura to increase its efficiency and improve reliability. A new design will then be tested which will be full-scale and made to generate between 500 kilowatts and one megawatt of power.

At the end of 2017, Northwest Energy Innovations (NWEI) intends to install a full-scale model. The 500-kilowatt to 1-megawatt generator will be situated in a 60 to 80-meter-deep (100–150 feet) berth. One megawatt is sufficient to provide electricity to several hundred homes.

See also 

 Wave farm
 List of wave power stations

References

External links
 
 Diagram

Wave energy converters
Energy in Hawaii
Industrial buildings and structures in Hawaii
2015 in the environment
2015 introductions